Ragala is a town in central western Sri Lanka.

Agriculture
The town's agricultural exports consist of tea leaves to tea production companies such as Dilmah.

Transport
It used to be served by a narrow gauge branchline of the national railway network, part of which is being rebuilt to broad gauge.

See also
 Railway stations in Sri Lanka

References

Populated places in Sri Lanka